The German torpedo boat T30 was one of fifteen Type 39 torpedo boats built for the Kriegsmarine (German Navy) during World War II. Completed in late 1943, the boat was assigned to support German operations in the Baltic Sea. She laid minefields in the Gulf of Finland, off the Estonian coast, in mid-April, before she was tasked to support Finnish forces in June. The following month, T30 helped to sink a Soviet patrol boat. After a navigational error caused her to enter a German minefield as she was preparing to lay one herself in August, the boat sank after striking several mines with the loss of 137 crewmen.

Design and description
The Type 39 torpedo boat was conceived as a general-purpose design, much larger than preceding German torpedo boats. Their crew numbered 206 officers and sailors. The Type 39s were fitted with a pair of geared steam turbine sets, each driving one propeller, using steam from four high-pressure water-tube boilers.

As built, the Type 39 ships mounted four  SK C/32 guns in single mounts protected by gun shields; one forward of the superstructure, one between the funnels, and two aft, one superfiring over the other. Anti-aircraft defense was provided by four  SK C/30 AA guns in two twin-gun mounts on platforms abaft the rear funnel, six  C/38 guns in one quadruple mount on the aft superstructure and a pair of single mounts on the bridge wings. They carried six above-water  torpedo tubes in two triple mounts amidships and could also carry 30 mines; the full complement of 60 mines made the ships top-heavy which could be dangerous in bad weather. For anti-submarine work the boats were fitted with a S-Gerät sonar and four depth charge launchers. The Type 39s were equipped with a FuMO 21 radar and various FumB radar detectors were installed late in the war.

Construction and career
Originally ordered as a Type 37 torpedo boat on 30 March 1939, T30 was reordered on 10 November 1939 from Schichau, laid down on 10 April 1942 at their  Elbing, East Prussia, shipyard as yard number 1489, launched on 13 March 1943 and commissioned on 24 October 1943. After working up, the boat was attached to the 6th Destroyer Flotilla and helped to lay minefields in Narva Bay in mid-April 1944. T30 and her sister  were tasked to support Finnish forces in Vyborg Bay and Koivisto Sound during the Vyborg–Petrozavodsk Offensive. On 20 June they engaged Soviet motor torpedo boats and claimed 3–5 boats sunk, but T31 was sunk by a torpedo. Afterwards, she was assigned to the 2nd Torpedo Boat Flotilla and participated in a failed attempt to recapture the island of Narvi on 27/28 June together with the torpedo boats ,  and Finnish forces. The three torpedo boats damaged a Soviet patrol boat off Narva, Estonia, on 16 July. By August T30 had been transferred to the 6th Torpedo Boat Flotilla. Reinforced by their sister  from the 5th Torpedo Boat Flotilla, the boats each loaded 54 mines in Helsinki, Finland, and departed on the evening of the 17th. Shortly after midnight, they started to lay their mines, but had only just begun when T30 struck a pair of mines about 00:25 which knocked out her power and gave her a list to port. About a minute after that T32 also struck a pair of mines that blew her bow off and disabled her engines. At 00:30 T30 exploded and broke in half, probably after hitting another mine.

Notes

Citations

References

External links
 T30 at german navy.de

Type 39 torpedo boats
1943 ships
Ships built by Schichau
Ships built in Elbing
Maritime incidents in August 1944